Kleinvielener See is a lake in the Mecklenburgische Seenplatte district in Mecklenburg-Vorpommern, Germany. At an elevation of 51.1 m, its surface area is 0.98 km².

Lakes of Mecklenburg-Western Pomerania
Nature reserves in Mecklenburg-Western Pomerania